Trichagalma formosana is a gall wasp species in the family Cynipidae whose life cycle involves only Palaearctic oaks, Quercus subgen. Quercus,
in the section Cerris. It is endemic to Taiwan.

Description and biology
Trichagalma formosana is only known from galls on Quercus variabilis and Q. acutissima. New galls appear in August. Adults emerged in December in the lab, but in the wild they might overwinter in the gall and emerge next spring.

References

Further reading
Melika, George, et al. "Four New Species of Dryocosmus gallwasps from Taiwan (Hymenoptera: Cynipidae: Cynipini)." ISRN Zoology 2011 (2011).
Ide, Tatsuya, and Yoshihisa Abe. "A New Species of Dryocosmus Giraud (Hymenoptera: Cynipidae: Cynipini) in Japan and Korea-First Record of Eastern Palearctic Dryocosmus Species Showing Alternation of Generations on Section Cerris Oaks." Proceedings of the Entomological Society of Washington 117.4 (2015): 467–180.

External links

Cynipidae
Gall-inducing insects
Oak galls
Insects of Taiwan
Endemic fauna of Taiwan
Insects described in 2010